Hampala ampalong is a species of cyprinid in the genus Hampala.

References

Cyprinidae
Cyprinid fish of Asia
Fish of Indonesia